International Film Festival of Thrissur (IFFT) is an annual event held in Thrissur in Kerala. It started in August 2004 as a joint venture by Thrissur Chalachitra Kendram, a film fraternity of Thrissur, Thrissur Corporation, Thrissur Jilla panchayath, Kerala State Film Development Corporation and the Federation of Film Societies of India. It is the second-largest film festival in Kerala. Masters and Classics, Children's films, Young films, Beyond Universe, Folk waves and Contemporary World Films are the major sessions in the festival.

References

Documentary film festivals in India
Short film festivals in India
Film festivals in Kerala
Culture of Thrissur
2004 establishments in Kerala
Festivals in Thrissur district
Film festivals established in 2004